The SGH-X200 is a mobile phone from Samsung. The phone focuses on being small and light rather than on advanced features like camera and music.

The phone features a 2.5 mm headset jack and an infrared port for synchronizing with a PC.

The proprietary port on the bottom of the phone is used for charging the device and can also be connected via a serial cable to a computer.

References 

X200
Mobile phones introduced in 2005
Mobile phones with infrared transmitter